In computer music and professional audio creation, a DirectX plugin is a software processing component that can be loaded as a plugin into host applications to allow real-time processing, audio effects, mixing audio or act as virtual synthesizers. DirectX plugins allow the replacement of traditional recording studio hardware and rack units used in professional studios with software-based counterparts that can be connected together in a modular way. This allows host manufacturers to focus on the conviviality and efficiency of their products while specialized manufacturers can focus on the digital signal processing aspect. For example, there are plugins for effects boxes, such as reverbs and delays, effects pedals, like guitar distortion, flange and chorus, and for mixing and mastering processors such as compressors, limiters, exciters, sub bass enhancers, stereo imagers and many more.

Overview 

Similar to Virtual Studio Technology and later, Audio Units in Apple Mac OS X, DirectX plugins have an open standard architecture for connecting audio synthesizers and effect plugins to audio editors and hard-disk recording systems. DirectX plug-ins are based on Microsoft's Component Object Model (COM) which allows plugins to be recognised and used by other applications via common interfaces. Plugins connect to applications and other plugins with pins via which they can pass and processes buffered streams of audio (or video) data.  Architecturally, DirectX plugins are DirectShow filters.

Types and compatibility 

DirectX plugins are also of two types, DirectX effect plugins (DX) and DirectX Instrument plugins (DXi). Effect plugins are used to generate, process, receive, or otherwise manipulate streams of audio. Instrument plugins are MIDI controllable DirectX plugins, generally used to synthesize sound or playback sampled audio using virtual synthesizers, samplers or drum machines. DirectX effect plugins were developed by Microsoft as part of DirectShow. DirectX instruments were developed by Cakewalk in co-operation with Microsoft and are available on Windows. 

Several wrapper plugins are available   so that DirectX plugins can be used in applications which only support VST and vice versa. Others such as chainer plugins are also available   which allow chaining multiple plugins together.

Programmability 

DirectX plugins can be developed in C++ using Microsoft's DirectX SDK, Sony's Audio Plug-In Development Kit or Cakewalk's DirectX Wizard. There is also a Delphi SDK available.

DirectX plugin hosts 
 ACID Pro (version 3.0 or later)
 Adobe Audition (Formerly Cool Edit 2000 and Cool Edit Pro 1.0, 2.0)
 Cakewalk Sonar (version 2.0 or later)
 MAGIX Samplitude
 REAPER
 Sony Vegas
 Sound Forge
 Steinberg Wavelab
 Steinberg Nuendo
 Steinberg Cubase
 OpenMPT

Future 
DirectX plugins are superseded by DMO-based signal processing filters and more recently, by Media Foundation Transforms.

See also 
 Virtual Studio Technology, a similar standard by Steinberg
 Computer music
 MIDI
 Digital audio workstation
 DirectX Media Objects
 Media Foundation Transform

References

External links 
 All types of audio plugins, effects and instruments
 Hitsquad Musician Network: Collection of DirectX plugins
 AnalogX DirectX plugins

Plugin DirectX plugin
Microsoft application programming interfaces
Music software plugin architectures